Waldemar Romuald Baszanowski (15 August 1935 – 29 April 2011) was a Polish lightweight (-67.5 kg) weightlifter. In 1969, he was chosen the Polish Sportspersonality of the Year.

Biography
Baszanowski was born in Grudziądz on 15 August 1935. A month after his 25th birthday he competed for the World Championships in his sport.  He became over the course of the next ten years the most decorated lightweight weightlifter at international level in the first century of its widespread competition, the 20th century.

Baszanowski set 24 world and 61 national records. He won gold medals at the 1964 and 1968 Olympics, five world championships and five silver medals, giving him a total of 10 medals, more than any weightlifter in history (to date).

His first wife Anita was killed in a car accident in 1969, 8 July, in which he was the driver; Baszanowski and his son survived.

In 1993 Baszanowski was inducted into the International Weightlifting Federation Hall of Fame. In 1999, he became the President of the European Weightlifting Federation.

In 2007, Baszanowski fell off a tree in his garden, broke his back and was paralyzed from the neck down. After four years of immobility, he died in Warsaw at the age of 75 on 29 April 2011. He is buried at the Służew New Cemetery.

References

External links

 
 
 
 

1935 births
2011 deaths
Polish male weightlifters
Olympic gold medalists for Poland
Olympic weightlifters of Poland
Olympic medalists in weightlifting
Weightlifters at the 1960 Summer Olympics
Weightlifters at the 1964 Summer Olympics
Weightlifters at the 1968 Summer Olympics
Weightlifters at the 1972 Summer Olympics
Medalists at the 1968 Summer Olympics
Medalists at the 1964 Summer Olympics
World Weightlifting Championships medalists
People from Grudziądz
Sportspeople from Kuyavian-Pomeranian Voivodeship